"Tulu'i Islam" ("Dawn of Islam") is an Urdu poem written by Muhammad Iqbal, expounding on the birth and glory of Islam.

See also 
Index of Muhammad Iqbal–related articles

Poetry by Muhammad Iqbal